Germany is scheduled to compete at the 2024 Summer Olympics in Paris from 26 July to 11 August 2024. It will be the nation's ninth consecutive appearance at the Summer Olympic Games after its reunification in 1990.

Competitors
The following is the list of number of competitors in the Games. Note that reserves in field hockey, football, and handball are not counted:

Athletics

German track and field athletes achieved the entry standards for Paris 2024, either by passing the direct qualifying mark (or time for track and road races) or by world ranking, in the following events (a maximum of 3 athletes each):

Track and road events

Equestrian

Germany entered a full squad of equestrian riders each to the team dressage, eventing, and jumping competitions through a top-seven finish in dressage and top-five in jumping the 2022 FEI World Championships in Herning, Denmark, and through a top-six finish at the Eventing Worlds on the same year in Pratoni del Vivaro, Italy.

Dressage

Qualification Legend: Q = Qualified for the final based on position in group; q = Qualified for the final based on overall position

Eventing

Jumping

Gymnastics 

Germany entered one rhythmic gymnast into the individual all-around tournament by winning a silver medal and securing one of the three available berths at the 2022 World Championships in Sofia, Bulgaria.

Shooting

German shooters achieved quota places for the following events based on their results at the 2022 and 2023 ISSF World Championships, 2022, 2023, and 2024 European Championships, 2023 European Games, and 2024 ISSF World Olympic Qualification Tournament, if they obtained a minimum qualifying score (MQS) from 14 August 2022 to 9 June 2024.

References

Nations at the 2024 Summer Olympics
2024
2024 in German sport